James E. Bonner is a United States Army major general who serves as the commanding general of the United States Army Maneuver Support Center of Excellence and Fort Leonard Wood since June 2020. He previously served as commanding general of the 20th Chemical, Biological, Radiological, Nuclear, Explosives Command and before that, as commandant of the United States Army Chemical, Biological, Radiological, and Nuclear School.

In November 2012, Bonner was inducted into the Southern Illinois University Army Reserve Officers' Training Corps Hall of Fame.

In February 2023, Bonner was assigned as deputy commanding general of United States Army North.

References

Year of birth missing (living people)
Living people
People from Anna, Illinois
Southern Illinois University alumni
Central Michigan University alumni
Naval War College alumni
United States Army Command and General Staff College alumni
United States Army generals
Military personnel from Illinois